Enos (born about 1957 – died November 4, 1962) was the second chimpanzee launched into space by NASA. He was the first  and only chimpanzee, and third hominid after cosmonauts Yuri Gagarin and Gherman Titov, to orbit the Earth. Enos's flight occurred on November 29, 1961.

Enos was brought from the Miami Rare Bird Farm on April 3, 1960. He completed more than 1,250 training hours at the University of Kentucky and Holloman Air Force Base. Training was more intense for him than for his predecessor Ham, who had become the first great ape in space in January 1961, because Enos was exposed to weightlessness and higher gs for longer periods of time. His training included psychomotor instruction and aircraft flights.

Enos was selected for his Project Mercury flight only three days before launch. Two months prior, NASA launched Mercury-Atlas 4 on September 13, 1961, to conduct an identical mission with a "crewman simulator" on board. Enos flew into space aboard Mercury-Atlas 5 on November 29, 1961. He completed his first orbit in 1 hour and 28.5 minutes.

Enos was scheduled to complete three orbits, but the mission was aborted after two, due to two issues: capsule overheating and a malfunctioning "avoidance conditioning" test subjecting the primate to 76 electrical shocks. According to one history of primatology, "The chimpanzee, about five years old, behaved like a true hero: despite the malfunctions of the electronic system, he conscientiously performed all the tasks he had learned during the entire flight of over three hours...Enos demonstrated that he was careful to successfully complete his mission and that he perfectly understood what was expected of him."

The capsule was brought aboard  in the late afternoon and Enos was immediately taken below deck by his Air Force handlers. Stormes arrived in Bermuda the next day.

Enos's flight was a full dress rehearsal for the next Mercury launch on February 20, 1962, which would make John Glenn the first American to orbit Earth, after astronauts Alan Shepard, Jr. and Gus Grissom's successful suborbital space flights. 

On November 4, 1962, Enos died of shigellosis-related dysentery, which was resistant to then-known antibiotics. He was constantly observed for two months before his death. Pathologists reported no symptoms that could be attributed or related to his previous space flight.

See also
 Monkeys and apes in space 
 Albert II, first monkey and first primate in space
 Little Joe 2 flight with Sam, Project Mercury rhesus monkey 
 Animals in space
 List of individual apes
 One Small Step: The Story of the Space Chimps: (2008 documentary)
 Félicette: First cat in space

References

External links

Enos the Chimpanzee travels to space on NASA's Mercury Atlas 5 1960, YouTube video
"Voyage of space chimpanzee Enos ended in Bermuda" by Gail Westerfield

One Small Step: The Story of the Space Chimps, documentary on history of chimpanzees used in space travel
 Atlantic.com article about electrical shocks
 MentalFloss.com on 54th anniversary of flight

1950s animal births
1962 animal deaths
1961 in spaceflight
Animals in space
Deaths from dysentery
Individual chimpanzees
Project Mercury
Year of birth missing
Place of birth missing
Non-human primate astronauts of the American space program